Fourbass Lake is a lake in Timiskaming District, Ontario, Canada, about  east of Temagami.

Hydrology
The primary inflow is the Matabitchuan River, from Rabbit Lake further upstream, at the southern tip. Other inflows are unnamed creeks from Cooper Lake at the east and Gorrie Lake at the west. The primary outflow is also the Matabitchuan River, at the northwest tip. Highway 567 leads from the community of North Cobalt (in Temiskaming Shores) to the generating station. The lake's waters flow via the Matabitchuan River into Lake Timiskaming, then via the Ottawa River into the St. Lawrence River.

See also 
 Timiskaming Dam-Bridge of Quebec Replacement Project,August 21, 2018 
 Timiskaming Dam complex first phase opens

References

Lakes of Timiskaming District